The following page lists all the power stations in Sweden. For traction power, see List of installations for 15 kV AC railway electrification in Sweden.

Nuclear

Fossil fuel

Hydroelectric 
There are perhaps a thousand more hydroelectric plants in Sweden not listed here, but these are among the biggest. Today, there are 46 stations at 100 MW and over, 18 at 200 MW and over, 6 at 400 MW and over, and 2 over 500 MW.

Wind farms

See also 

 List of largest power stations in the world

References

External links
 Operational reports over Swedish wind power (in Swedish)

Sweden
Lists of buildings and structures in Sweden